"It's Just a Matter of Time" is a popular song written by Brook Benton, Clyde Otis, and Belford Hendricks. The original recording by Benton topped the Billboard Hot R&B Sides chart in 1959 and peaked at No. 3 on the Hot 100 pop chart, the first in a string of hits for Benton that ran through 1970.

The song later found a second life as a country song, with major hit recordings by three different country music performers during the 1970s and 1980s, two of which hit number one.

Origin and original success

Writing
Brook Benton, Belford Hendricks and Clyde Otis established themselves as a songwriting team in the late 1950s, penning hits for Nat King Cole ("Looking Back") and Clyde McPhatter ("A Lover's Question"). During one songwriting session, Benton expressed frustration that they were not hitting on any good ideas, to which Otis replied, "It's just a matter of time, Brook". Those words inspired them to write a love song from the point of view of a man who misses his love, but believes she will come back to him.

Benton's recording
Benton and Otis placed the song on a demo tape for Cole, and he agreed to record it. However, Otis became an A&R manager at Mercury Records, and signed Benton to the label. Otis felt that "It's Just A Matter Of Time" would be an ideal single for Benton, and he asked Cole not to record the song so it could be Benton's first release on the label. Belford Hendricks, a classically trained composer, co-wrote and arranged the recording. Benton's version, in a style clearly influenced by Cole, was a quick success, rising to number three on the Billboard pop charts while topping the R&B chart for 9 weeks in the spring of 1959, the longest run atop the chart of any song that year. On April 12, during the song's chart run, Benton made his national television debut, singing the song on The Ed Sullivan Show.  While Benton had had one previous minor hit ("A Million Miles From Nowhere"), this success established him to the public, leading to a continuous string of hits through 1962, and occasional success thereafter.

Chart positions

Country renditions

Sonny James version

The first cover version that became a country hit was recorded by Sonny James; his version spent four weeks atop the Billboard magazine Hot Country Singles chart in February 1970. The song was James' 10th in a string of 16 consecutive chart-topping single releases, spanning from 1967-1971.

James performed the song on The Ed Sullivan Show on January 11, 1970 (just days after the single was released) and Hee Haw on January 21.

Chart positions

Glen Campbell version
In 1985, Glen Campbell — at the time on the roster of Atlantic America Records — recorded his version and released it as a single. His version peaked at No. 7 on the Billboard Hot Country Singles chart in February 1986.

Chart positions

Randy Travis version

Randy Travis became the third country artist to find success with the song. Released in August 1989 as the lead-off single to the album No Holdin' Back, Travis' version became his 10th No. 1 hit on the Billboard Hot Country Singles chart.

Travis' bluesy rendition was initially recorded as part of the album Rock, Rhythm & Blues, a 10-song compilation featuring covers of 1950s-era pop hits by 1980s stars. The song was later included on No Holdin' Back after Travis and others liked what they had just recorded.

Chart positions

Year-end charts

References

See also
[ Randy Travis - No Holdin' Back] at Billboard.com

1959 songs
1959 singles
1970 singles
1986 singles
1989 singles
Brook Benton songs
Glen Campbell songs
Randy Travis songs
Sonny James songs
Songs written by Clyde Otis
Songs written by Brook Benton
Song recordings produced by Harold Shedd
Mercury Records singles
Capitol Records singles
Atlantic Records singles
Warner Records singles
Song recordings produced by Richard Perry
Song recordings produced by George Richey
Songs written by Belford Hendricks